The Starck AS-70 Jac is a French-built single-seat light aircraft of the mid-1940s.

Development

The AS-70 was developed during 1945 as a single-seat light low-wing monoplane aircraft to serve the early postwar needs of French private pilots and aero clubs. It is of mixed welded steel tube and wooden construction with fabric covering, and is fully aerobatic.

A small series of Jacs was constructed by Avions Starck. Different designations were given to aircraft powered by the various engines, as listed below.

Operational history
The Jac proved to be a popular aircraft with private pilots and aero clubs and four examples remained in service in 2009.

Variants
 AS-70  Fitted with a  Salmson 9 ADb radial engine.
 AS-71  Fitted with a  Walter Mikron II engine.
 AS-72  Fitted with a Salmson 9 ADr radial engine.
 AS-72/1 Fitted with a Percy II engine.
 AS-75  Fitted with a  Continental A65-8S 4-cylinder air-cooled engine.

Specifications (AS-75)

Notes

References
 

|

Further reading

External links

Aviafrance site with details and image of the A.S. 70 Jac

1940s French civil utility aircraft
Low-wing aircraft
Single-engined tractor aircraft
Aircraft first flown in 1945